Gentzler is a surname. Notable people with the surname include:

Doreen Gentzler (born 1957), American television news anchor
Edwin Gentzler (born 1951), American literary scholar and translator